Victoria Azarenka was the defending champion, but could not compete after announcing her pregnancy in July 2016.

Karolína Plíšková won the title, defeating Alizé Cornet in the final, 6–0, 6–3.

Seeds
The top two seeds received a bye into the second round.

Draw

Finals

Top half

Bottom half

Qualifying

Seeds

Qualifiers

Lucky losers
 Kateryna Bondarenko

Qualifying draw

First qualifier

Second qualifier

Third qualifier

Fourth qualifier

External links
 Main draw
 Qualifying draw

Women's Singles
2017 WTA Tour